DWMV (89.1 FM), broadcasting as 89.1 Idol News FM, is a radio station owned and operated by Apollo Broadcast Investors. Its studios are located at the Door #7, Citispire Building, Imelda C. Roces Ave. Tahao Rd., Brgy. Gogon, Legazpi City, and its transmitter is located at Mt. Bariw, Brgy. Estanza, near GMA Network and ABS-CBN Tower Transmitter.

The station was an affiliate of Radyo Bandera from late 2017 until July 29, 2018.

References

Radio stations in Legazpi, Albay
DWMV